The 1991-92 LSU Tigers men's basketball team represented Louisiana State University during the 1991–92 NCAA men's college basketball season. The head coach was Dale Brown. The team was a member of the Southeastern Conference and played their home games at 
Pete Maravich Assembly Center.

Roster

Schedule and results

|-
!colspan=9 style=| Exhibition

|-
!colspan=9 style=| Non-conference regular season

|-
!colspan=9 style=| SEC regular season

|-
!colspan=12 style=| SEC Tournament

|-
!colspan=12 style=| NCAA Tournament

Rankings

Awards and honors
Shaquille O'Neal – SEC Player of the Year (2x), Consensus First-team All-American (2x)

Team players drafted into the NBA

References

LSU Tigers basketball seasons
Lsu
Lsu
LSU
LSU